Scott A. Barlow (born December 18, 1992) is an American professional baseball pitcher for the Kansas City Royals of Major League Baseball (MLB). He made his MLB debut in 2018.

Career
Originally from Connecticut, Barlow's family moved to California his freshman year of high school, so he could play baseball year-round and have more exposure to professional scouts. He attended Golden Valley High School in Santa Clarita, California.

Los Angeles Dodgers
The Los Angeles Dodgers selected Barlow in the sixth round of the 2011 MLB draft. He signed with the Dodgers, rather than attend Fresno State.

After signing, Barlow made his professional debut that same year with the AZL Dodgers, giving up five earned runs in 1.2 innings pitched for the season. In 2012, he underwent Tommy John surgery and missed the whole season. He returned in 2013, pitching for the Ogden Raptors, compiling a 4–3 record and 6.20 ERA in 15 starts. In 2014, he played for the Great Lakes Loons where he was 6–7 with a 4.50 ERA in 23 games (21 starts) and in 2015 he pitched with the Rancho Cucamonga Quakes where he was 8–3 with a 2.52 ERA in 14 games (13 starts). He also pitched one game each with Great Lakes and the Oklahoma City Dodgers. Barlow spent 2016 with the Tulsa Drillers where he posted a 4–7 record with a 3.98 ERA and 1.42 WHIP in 24 games (23 starts), and 2017 with Tulsa and Oklahoma City where he compiled a combined 7–6 record and 3.29 ERA in 26 starts.

Kansas City Royals
Barlow became a free agent after the 2017 season, and signed a major league contract with the Royals. He began 2018 with the Omaha Storm Chasers.

The Royals promoted Barlow to the major leagues three times in April 2018; the first two times, he was sent back to Triple-A without making an appearance. Following his third call-up on April 28, Barlow made his MLB debut on April 30, pitching in relief against the Boston Red Sox.

Barlow made the Royals' 2019 Opening Day roster.  One April 17, he earned he first major league save by closing out a 4–3 win against the Chicago White Sox.

With the 2020 Kansas City Royals, Barlow appeared in a league-high 32 games, compiling a 2–1 record with 4.20 ERA and 39 strikeouts in 30 innings pitched.

On March 22, 2022, Barlow signed a $2.4 million contract with the Royals, avoiding salary arbitration.

International career
On October 29, 2018, he was selected MLB All-Stars at 2018 MLB Japan All-Star Series

Personal life
Barlow and his wife, Klancy, live in a campervan during the baseball season.

References

External links

1992 births
Living people
Arizona League Dodgers players
Baseball players from Connecticut
Glendale Desert Dogs players
Great Lakes Loons players
Kansas City Royals players
Major League Baseball pitchers
Ogden Raptors players
Oklahoma City Dodgers players
Omaha Storm Chasers players
Rancho Cucamonga Quakes players
Sportspeople from New London, Connecticut
Tulsa Drillers players